Mordellistena dolini is a beetle in the genus Mordellistena of the family Mordellidae. It is found only in Azerbaijan. It was described in 2005 by Odnosum.

References

dolini
Beetles described in 2005
Endemic fauna of Azerbaijan